Everland Resort is a theme park and vacation resort located in Yongin, Gyeonggi-do, South Korea. It is owned and operated by Samsung Everland. The resort opened in April, 1976, as a single theme park (Everland), but developed into a resort with water parks, hostels, speedways, golf course and museums.

Attractions
Everland Resort has two main entertainment sections: Everland and Caribbean Bay.

Units

Everland

Caribbean Bay

Caribbean Bay is South Korea's largest (2010) water park. The outdoor zone is not open all year due to weather conditions (Winter and Rainy Seasons). The aquatic center(inside) opens all year. It is divided into 5 distinct zones.

Wild River
Wild River (opened in summer 2008) is a zone for more advanced water play. It has 6 water tube slides including the Tower Bumerango.

Sea Wave
Main attraction in the Sea Wave zone is the Wave Pool. It generates  artificial waves. It also has a sandy rest zone.

Aquatic Center

Aquatic Center is an indoor zone in Caribbean Bay. It has several regular pools, 3 water slides, indoor wave pool, spas, and saunas. It is open all year.

Fortress
Fortress is a water-themed ride. It has streaming pool (called "Lazy Pool"), a Surfing Ride, an Adventure pool and spas.

Bay Slide
Bay Slide is a water ride located within the park. It has 6 tube rides and 3 water bobsleighs.

Everland Speedway
Everland Speedway is South Korea's first racing track. The speedway has held racing events of various scales. It also gives opportunities to experience and enjoy race car driving for ordinary people with no previous racing experience.

Home Bridge
Home Bridge is a hostel at Everland Resort.

Glen Rose
Glen Rose is a golf course at Everland Resort.

Ho-am Art Museum

Event
Everland will host the tulip festival from April 16 to April 29, marking the beginning of the nation's flower festival with warm spring.
The tulip festival period is also extended until 9 p.m. every night.

Samsung Transportation Museum

References

External links

 

 
Buildings and structures in Yongin
Samsung subsidiaries
Parks in Gyeonggi Province
Amusement parks in South Korea
Service companies of South Korea
1976 establishments in South Korea
Amusement parks opened in 1976